Eric Chisnall (born 5 July 1946) is an English former professional rugby league footballer who played in the 1960s, 1970s and 1980.

Background
Chisnall was born in St. Helens, Lancashire, England.

Playing career

International honours
Eric Chisnall won caps for England while at St. Helens in 1975 against France, in the 1975 Rugby League World Cup against Wales, and New Zealand, and Australia (sub), in 1975 against Papua New Guinea (non-test), and won caps for Great Britain while at St. Helens in 1974 against Australia (2 matches), and New Zealand (2 matches).

World Club Challenge Final appearances
Eric Chisnall played left- in St. Helens 2–25 defeat by the 1975 NSWRFL season premiers, Eastern Suburbs Roosters in the unofficial 1976 World Club Challenge at Sydney Cricket Ground on Tuesday 29 June 1976.

Challenge Cup Final appearances
Eric Chisnall played right-, i.e. number 12, in St. Helens' 16–13 victory over Leeds in the 1972 Challenge Cup Final during the 1971–72 season at Wembley Stadium, London on Saturday 13 May 1972, and played right-, i.e. number 12, in the 20–5 victory over Widnes in the 1976 Challenge Cup Final during the 1975–76 season at Wembley Stadium, London on Saturday 8 May 1976.

County Cup Final appearances
Eric Chisnall played right-, i.e. number 12, and scored a try in St. Helens' 13–10 victory over Warrington in the 1967 Lancashire County Cup Final replay during the 1967–68 season at Station Road, Swinton on Saturday 2 December 1967 (he replaced John Mantle, who had played in the previous drawn final), played right-, and scored a try in the 30–2 victory over Oldham in the 1968 Lancashire County Cup Final during the 1968–69 season at Central Park, Wigan on Friday 25 October 1968, and played left-, i.e. number 8, in Leigh's 7–4 victory over St. Helens in the 1970 Lancashire County Cup Final during the 1970–71 season at Station Road, Swinton on Saturday 28 November 1970.

BBC2 Floodlit Trophy Final appearances
Eric Chisnall was an interchange/substitute, i.e. number 15, in St. Helens' 4–7 defeat by Wigan in the 1968 BBC2 Floodlit Trophy Final during the 1968–69 season at Central Park, Wigan on Tuesday 17 December 1968, played right-, i.e. number 10, in the 5–9 defeat by Leeds in the 1970 BBC2 Floodlit Trophy Final during the 1970–71 season at Headingley Rugby Stadium, Leeds on Tuesday 15 December 1970, played right- in the 8–2 victory over Rochdale Hornets in the 1971 BBC2 Floodlit Trophy Final during the 1971–72 season at Headingley Rugby Stadium, Leeds on Tuesday 14 December 1971, and played right-, i.e. number 12, in the 22–2 victory over Dewsbury in the 1975 BBC2 Floodlit Trophy Final during the 1975–76 season at Knowsley Road, St. Helens on Tuesday 16 December 1975.

Honoured at St. Helens
Eric Chisnall is a St Helens R.F.C. Hall of Fame inductee.

Genealogical information
Eric Chisnall is the younger brother of the rugby league footballer who played in the 1960s and 1970s for Leigh; Les Chisnall, and the older brother of the rugby league footballer; David "Dave" Chisnall.

References

External links
Profile at saints.org.uk

1946 births
Living people
England national rugby league team players
English rugby league players
Great Britain national rugby league team players
Leigh Leopards players
Rugby league players from St Helens, Merseyside
Rugby league props
Rugby league second-rows
St Helens R.F.C. players